Shen Jian (born 14 May 1975) is a Chinese gymnast. He competed at  the 1996 Summer Olympics in Atlanta, winning a silver medal in men's team competition.

References

1975 births
Living people
Chinese male artistic gymnasts
Olympic gymnasts of China
Olympic silver medalists for China
Gymnasts at the 1996 Summer Olympics
Olympic medalists in gymnastics
Medalists at the 1996 Summer Olympics
Medalists at the World Artistic Gymnastics Championships
20th-century Chinese people